The HADAG (full name HADAG Seetouristik und Fährdienst AG, literally "HADAG Sea-tourism and Ferry service") is a local public transport company in Hamburg, Germany. It owns and operates passengers ferries across the Elbe River, overseen by and integrated into the network of Hamburger Verkehrsverbund (HVV). In 2013, 10.6 million passenger journeys were made on the HADAG network.

In the 1950s the company operated ferries from Hamburg to England, and in the 1980s, the cruise ship MS Astor.

History

The Hafen-Dampfschifffahrt AG (HADAG) was founded on 8 August 1888, and the Free and Hanseatic City of Hamburg granted the concession to operate ferries in the Port of Hamburg. In 1897, the HADAG owned 47 ferries and took over the smaller Jollenführer Dampfer GmbH. With opening of the Elbe tunnel in 1911, the HADAG line Landungsbrücken — Steinwerder lost 259,000 passengers p.a..

In 1918, with the end of the concession, the HADAG wanted to rise the fare price. The city of Hamburg refused and the company was in danger of liquidation. On 23 October 1918, the city of Hamburg acquired the HADAG. Later it became a subsidiary for the Hamburger Hochbahn (HHA). In 1928 the HHA and HADAG established a shared fare for the trains, trams, and buses of the HHA and the ferries of the HADAG.

In the 1950s, the HADAG operated a ferry to England and to the islands Heligoland and Sylt. In 1966, the last steam ferries were taken out of service. In 1982, HADAG closed the ferry line from Landungsbrücken to the Heligoland island, and started a line from Cuxhaven, with a combined fare with Deutsche Bundesbahn, in 1983. Until 1983, the HADAG owned the cruise ship MS Astor.

Operations

The HADAG runs public transport ferries and pleasure boats on the rivers Elbe and Alster. The public transport is supervised by the Hamburger Verkehrsverbund.

Scheduled harbour ferries

Non-scheduled harbour cruises

See also 

 Transport in Hamburg 
 List of rivers of Hamburg

References

External links

Pictures of the ferries Hadag
Website 
 

Companies based in Hamburg
Ferry companies of Germany
Ferry transport in Hamburg
Transport companies established in 1888
1888 establishments in Germany